The 2018–19 South Dakota State Jackrabbits women's basketball represent South Dakota State University in the 2018–19 NCAA Division I women's basketball season. The Jackrabbits, led by nineteenth year head coach Aaron Johnston, compete in the Summit League. They play home games in Frost Arena in Brookings, South Dakota. They finished the season 28–7, 15–1 in Summit League play to win the Summit League regular season. They were champions of The Summit League women's tournament and earn an automatic trip to the NCAA women's tournament where defeated Quinnipiac and upset Syracuse in the first and second rounds to advanced to their first sweet sixteen appearance in the Division I where they lost to Oregon.

Previous season
The Jackrabbits went 26–7 overall and 12–2 in conference play finishing second. The Jackrabbits won the 2018 Summit League Tournament defeating North Dakota State in the quarterfinals, Western Illinois in the semifinals, and South Dakota in the Summit League Championship 65–50 earning the Jackrabbits an automatic bid to the 2018 NCAA Division I women's basketball tournament.

During the selection show, the Jackrabbits received an 8 seed in the Spokane region facing the Villanova Wildcats, but lost in overtime 81–74.

Roster

Schedule

|-
!colspan=9 style=| Exhibition

|-
!colspan=9 style=| Non-conference regular season

|-
!colspan=9 style=| The Summit League regular season

|-
!colspan=9 style=| The Summit League Women's Tournament

|-
!colspan=9 style=| NCAA Women's Tournament

Rankings
2018–19 NCAA Division I women's basketball rankings

References

South Dakota State Jackrabbits women's basketball seasons
South Dakota State
Jack
Jack
South Dakota State